Tetegu is a community in the Weija-Gbawe Municipality of the Greater Accra Region of Ghana. The Densu River passes through Tetegu.

Infrastructures 

 Tetegu Police Station
 Tetegu Community-Based Health Planning and Services

References 

Greater Accra Region
Communities in Ghana